The 2015–16 Polish Basketball League, for sponsorship reasons the Tauron Basket Liga,  was the 82nd season of the highest professional basketball tier in Poland and the 20th since the foundation of the Polish Basketball League.

Teams
Promoted from the 2014–15 1 Liga:
BM Slam Stal Ostrów Wielkopolski (1st)

{| class="wikitable sortable"
|-
! Team
! Location
! Stadium
! Capacity
|-
| Asseco Gdynia || Gdynia || Gdynia Sports Arena || align=right | 
|-
| AZS Koszalin || Koszalin || Hala Widowiskowo-Sportowa || align=right | 
|-
| Energa Czarni Słupsk || Słupsk || Hala Gryfia || align=right |  
|-
| BM Slam Stal Ostrów Wielkopolski  || Ostrów Wielkopolski || Hala Sportowa Stal || align=right | 
|-
| MKS Dąbrowa Górnicza   || Dąbrowa Górnicza || Hala Centrum || align=right |  
|-
| PGE Turów Zgorzelec || Zgorzelec || PGE Turów Arena || align=right | 
|-
| Polfarmex Kutno || Kutno || Hala SP9 ||align=right | 
|-
| Polski Cukier Toruń  || Toruń || Arena Toruń || align=right | 
|-
| Rosa Radom || Radom || ZSE Radom || align=right | 
|-
| Siarka Tarnobrzeg || Tarnobrzeg || Hala OSiR Wisła || style="text-align:right;"|  
|-
| Polpharma Starogard Gdański || Starogard Gdański || Argo-Kociewie || style="text-align:right;"|  
|-
| WKS Śląsk Wrocław || Wrocław || Hala Orbita ||align=right |
|-
| Start Lublin || Lublin || Hala Globus || style="text-align:right;"| 
|-
| Stelmet Zielona Góra || Zielona Góra || CRS Hall || align=right | 
|-
| Trefl Sopot || Sopot || Ergo Arena || align=right | 
|-
| Wilki Morskie Szczecin  || Szczecin || Azoty Arena || align=right |  
|- 
| WTK Anwil Włocławek || Włocławek || Hala Mistrzów || align=right | 
|}

Notes
 Promoted from the 1 Liga.

Regular season

Playoffs

Bracket

Quarter-finals

Semi-finals

Third-position play-off

Finals

Awards

Most Valuable Player

Finals MVP

Best Defender

Best Polish Player

Best Coach

Statistical leaders
Final statistical leaders after the Regular Season.

|  style="width:50%; vertical-align:top;"|

Points

|}
|}

|  style="width:50%; vertical-align:top;"|

Assists

|}
|}

Polish clubs in European competitions

References

External links
Polska Liga Koszykówki - Official Site 
Polish League at Eurobasket.com

Polish Basketball League seasons
Polish
Lea